The seventh and final season of the American comedy-drama television series Orange Is the New Black premiered on Netflix on July 26, 2019, at 12:00 am PDT in multiple countries. It consists of thirteen episodes, each between 55 and 89 minutes. The series is based on Piper Kerman's memoir, Orange Is the New Black: My Year in a Women's Prison (2010), about her experiences at FCI Danbury, a minimum-security federal prison. The series was created and adapted for television by Jenji Kohan.

The season chronicles Piper's life after being released contrasted against the experiences of other prisoners, some of whom now reside in immigration detention centers.

Episodes

Alternative ending
Another ending was considered for the show with Piper telling her story to Jenji Kohan, who would make it into a TV series. When Jenji told it to her son, he told her that the show and fans deserved better than that.

Cast and characters

Main cast

Recurring cast

Inmates

Staff

Detainees
 Karina Arroyave as Karla Córdova
 Marie-Lou Nahhas as Shani Abboud
 Melinna Bobadilla as Santos Chaj

Others

Special guest stars
 Jason Biggs as Larry Bloom
 Diane Guerrero as Maritza Ramos
 Michael Harney as Sam Healy
 Laverne Cox as Sophia Burset
 Samira Wiley as Poussey Washington
 Lea DeLaria as Carrie "Big Boo" Black
 Pablo Schreiber as George "Pornstache" Mendez

Guest stars

Production
In February 2016, Netflix gave the series a three-season renewal, which included its seventh season. In October 2018, it was confirmed that the seventh season would be its last. For the seventh season, Alysia Reiner was upgraded to series regular.

Reception

Critical response
On Metacritic, season 7 has a score of 82 out of 100, based on 10 reviews, indicating "universal acclaim." On Rotten Tomatoes, it has a 97% rating with an average score of 7.69/10, based on 32 reviews. The site's consensus reads: "Carried by its exceptional ensemble, Orange Is the New Blacks final season gets straight to the point, tackling hard-hitting issues with the same dramatic depth and gallows humor that made the show so ground-breaking to begin with".

Accolades
For the 72nd Primetime Emmy Awards, Laverne Cox received a nomination for Outstanding Guest Actress in a Drama Series.

References

External links
 
 

Orange Is the New Black
2019 American television seasons